Littorina keenae, the eroded periwinkle, is a species of sea snail in the family Littorinidae, the winkles or periwinkles.

References

Littorinidae
Gastropods described in 1978